James Jeffrey Sparks (born April 4, 1972) is a former pitcher for the Major League Baseball Tampa Bay Devil Rays. Sparks never won an MLB game but did pick up one save. It came on September 27, 1999 against the New York Yankees. Sparks went 1 1/3rd innings to save a 10-6 Devil Rays victory.

As of May 2007, Sparks was selling home-and-garden products at Lowe's and attending firefighter school while training with former major league pitcher Mike Marshall.

References

External links 

1972 births
Living people
Major League Baseball pitchers
Baseball players from Houston
Tampa Bay Devil Rays players
St. Mary's Rattlers baseball players
Nashville Sounds players
Nashua Pride players
Winnipeg Goldeyes players
Pensacola Pelicans players
Bangor Lumberjacks players
Burlington Bees players
Charleston AlleyCats players
Chattanooga Lookouts players
Durham Bulls players
Leones de Yucatán players
American expatriate baseball players in Mexico
Orlando Rays players
Princeton Reds players
St. Petersburg Devil Rays players
American expatriate baseball players in Canada